In Greek mythology, Zelus or Zelos (Ancient Greek: Ζῆλος Zēlos, literally 'zeal') was the daimon that personifies dedication, emulation, eager rivalry, envy, jealousy, and zeal. The English word "zeal" is derived from his name. His Roman equivalent was Invidia.

Family 
Zelus was the son of Pallas (the Titan) and  Styx (an Oceanid). His siblings were  Nike (Victory), Kratos (Strength) and Bia (Force).

Mythology

Titanomachy 
Zelus together with his siblings were winged enforcers who stood in attendance at Zeus' throne and formed part of his retinue.

Theogony

 And Styx the daughter of Okeanos (Oceanus) was joined to Pallas and bare Zelos (Zelus, Emulation) and trim-ankled Nike (Victory) in the house. Also she brought forth Kratos (Cratus, Strength) and Bia (Force), wonderful children. These have no house apart from Zeus, nor any dwelling nor path except that wherein God leads them, but they dwell always with Zeus the loud-thunderer. For so did Styx the deathless daughter of Okeanos plan on that day when the Olympian Lightener called all the deathless gods to great Olympos (Olympus), and said that whosoever of the gods would fight with him against the Titanes, he would not cast him out from his rights, but each should have the office which he had before amongst the deathless gods. And he declared that he who was without office and rights as is just. So deathless Styx came first to Olympos with her children through the wit of her dear father. And Zeus honoured her, and gave her very great gifts, for her he appointed to be the great oath of the gods, and her children to live with him always. And as he promised, so he performed fully unto them all.

Bibliotheca

 Nike, Kratos (Cratus), Zelos (Zelus), and Bia were born to Pallas and Styx. Zeus instituted and oath to be sworn by the waters of Styx that flowed from a rock in Haides' realm, an honor granted in return for the help she and her children gave him against the Titanes (Titans).

Other appearances 
Zelus’ Roman name was Invidia, which, in Latin, meant "to look against in a hostile manner". Because of its relation to Zelus, his Roman form was sometimes associated with the seven deadly sins.

Works and Days

 Among the men of the fifth age . . . There will be no favour for the man who keeps his oath or for the just (dikaios) or for the good (agathos); but rather men will praise the evil-doer (kakos) and his violent dealing (hybris). Strength will be right (dike) and reverence (aidos) will cease to be; and the wicked will hurt the worthy man, speaking false words against him, and will swear an oath upon them. Envy (zelos), foul-mouthed, delighting in evil, with scowling face, will go along with wretched men one and all. And then Aidos (Aedos, Shame) and Nemesis (Indignation), with their sweet forms wrapped in white robes, will go from the wide-pathed earth and forsake mankind to join the company of the deathless gods: and bitter sorrows (lugra algea) will be left for mortal men, and there will be no help against evil.

Cynegetica

 O father Zeus, how fierce a heart hath Zelos (Zelus, Rivalry)! Him hast thou made, O lord, mightier than nature to behold and has given him the bitter force of fire, and in his right hand hast vouchsafed to him to wear a sword of adamant. He preserves not, when he comes, dear children to their loving parents, he knows nor comrade nor kin nor cousin, when he intervenes grievous and unspeakable. He also in former times arrayed against their own children heroes themselves and hobble heroines.

Zelos may have also been identified with Agon, the personification of competition, and was closely connected with Eris. He was sometimes associated with Phthonus, the daimon of romantic jealousy.

Genealogical tree

Notes

References 

 Apollodorus, The Library with an English Translation by Sir James George Frazer, F.B.A., F.R.S. in 2 Volumes, Cambridge, MA, Harvard University Press; London, William Heinemann Ltd. 1921. . Online version at the Perseus Digital Library.
 Hesiod, Theogony from The Homeric Hymns and Homerica with an English Translation by Hugh G. Evelyn-White, Cambridge, MA.,Harvard University Press; London, William Heinemann Ltd. 1914. Online version at the Perseus Digital Library.
 Hesiod, Works and Days from The Homeric Hymns and Homerica with an English Translation by Hugh G. Evelyn-White, Cambridge, MA.,Harvard University Press; London, William Heinemann Ltd. 1914. Online version at the Perseus Digital Library.
 Hyginus, Gaius Julius, Fabulae in Apollodorus' Library and Hyginus' Fabulae: Two Handbooks of Greek Mythology, Translated, with Introductions by R. Scott Smith and Stephen M. Trzaskoma, Hackett Publishing Company,  2007. .

Greek gods
Personifications in Greek mythology
Olympian deities
Daimons
Rivalry
Jealousy